Robert Emmett Davis (born December 10, 1968) is a former American football long snapper in the National Football League and most recently assistant head coach for the Dallas Cowboys. He was originally signed by the New York Jets as an undrafted free agent in 1993. He played college football at Shippensburg.

Davis was also a member of the Baltimore Stallions, the Kansas City Chiefs, the Chicago Bears and Green Bay Packers during his career. He played the 11 seasons with the Packers before retiring following the 2007 season and joining the organization's front office.

Early years
Davis attended Eleanor Roosevelt High School in Greenbelt, Maryland and was a letterman in football and wrestling. Rob Davis graduated from Eleanor Roosevelt High School in 1986.

College career
Davis attended Shippensburg University, where he started as defensive tackle. He graduated in 1992 with a degree in criminal justice. He is one of only five Shippensburg alumni to play in the NFL.

Professional career

Early career
Davis was signed as an undrafted free agent by the New York Jets, but failed to make the team's roster. In 1995 Davis played in the Canadian Football League with the Baltimore Stallions. He was the team's starting long snapper. In 1996 Davis was signed by the Kansas City Chiefs, but he was cut before the season started. The Chicago Bears signed him that year and Davis played all 16 games as a long snapper.

Green Bay Packers
In 1997 the Green Bay Packers signed Rob Davis as a free agent. He started the final seven games of the season, as well as the playoffs and Super Bowl XXXII. Davis was the last remaining Packers player aside from Brett Favre who played in Super Bowl XXXII, and was also one of three Player Representatives for the National Football League Players Association on the Packers roster.

Davis officially retired from the NFL on March 26, 2008.

Post-playing career
Upon retiring from the NFL, Davis joined the Packers' staff as Director of Player Development. While working with the Packers, he earned his Masters Degree in Applied Leadership for Teaching & Learning at the University of Wisconsin-Green Bay in 2013. 
Davis worked for Pierce Manufacturing- an industry leader in fire apparatus. Rob helps lead the company's People First culture efforts as senior director of people and culture. Davis also coached Defensive Line at St. Norbert College, with an added focus on Player Development. Davis left the Oshkosh Corporation in January of 2020 to join former Packers head coach Mike McCarthy with the Dallas Cowboys organization.

Davis was among five Cowboys coaches let go at the conclusion of the 2022 season.

References

External links
Shippensburg Football Tribute Page
Green Bay Packers bio

1968 births
Living people
Players of American football from Washington, D.C.
American football defensive tackles
American football long snappers
Shippensburg Red Raiders football players
New York Jets players
American players of Canadian football
Canadian football offensive linemen
Baltimore Stallions players
Chicago Bears players
Green Bay Packers players
Green Bay Packers executives
Dallas Cowboys coaches